Al Israel (April 16, 1935 – March 16, 2011)  was an American film and TV actor who is best known for his role as the chainsaw-wielding Colombian drug dealer "Hector the Toad" in the 1983 film Scarface. He also appeared alongside Al Pacino in Carlito's Way a decade later.

He was one of three original cast members to voice the 2006 video game based on the film.  The game entitled Scarface: The World Is Yours sold more than two million units in less than two years.

Al Israel died on March 16, 2011, at age 75.

Filmography

References

External links
 
 
 Al Israel(Aveleyman)

American male film actors
American male television actors
Jewish American male actors
2011 deaths
1930s births
21st-century American Jews